José María Alonso de Areyzaga (24 March 1890 – 4 March 1979) was a Spanish male tennis player. He competed in the singles event at the 1920 Summer Olympics in which he lost in the first round to Ichiya Kumagae. With his brother Manuel Alonso he competed in the men's doubles event at the 1924 Summer Olympics and reached the quarterfinal. With his brother he reached the quarterfinal of the doubles event at the 1924 Wimbledon Championships.

References

External links

1890 births
1979 deaths
Spanish male tennis players
Olympic tennis players of Spain
Tennis players at the 1920 Summer Olympics
Tennis players at the 1924 Summer Olympics
Sportspeople from San Sebastián
Tennis players from the Basque Country (autonomous community)
20th-century Spanish people